William Bankes  may refer to:
William John Bankes (1786–1855), egyptologist
William George Hawtry Bankes (1836–1858), Victoria Cross recipient
William Bankes, showman and owner of the performing horse Marocco

See also
William Banks (disambiguation)